Outlook is a weekly general interest English and Hindi news magazine published in India.

History and profile
Outlook was first issued in October 1995 with Vinod Mehta as the editor in chief. It is owned by the Rajan Raheja Group. The publisher is Outlook Publishing (India) Pvt. Ltd. It features contents from politics, sports, cinema, and stories of broad interests. By December 2018, Outlook magazine's Facebook following had grown to over 12 lakh (1.2 million).

Staff

Editor 

Chinki Sinha

Editors-in-chief 
Vinod Mehta (1995 - 2012)
Krishna Prasad (2012–2016)
Rajesh Ramachandran (2016-2018)

Managing editors 
Tarun Tejpal (1995 - March 2000)

Notable contributors 
Arundhati Roy

References

External links

1995 establishments in Delhi
English-language magazines published in India
Magazines established in 1995
Magazines published in Delhi
News magazines published in India
Weekly magazines published in India